Scutellaria incana, the hoary skullcap or downy skullcap, is a flowering plant in the family Lamiaceae (mint family) and is native to North America. It is a perennial flowering plant and is primarily found in the eastern United States as well as some parts of the Midwest.

Description
As with many other plants in the mint family, its stems are 4-angled (square). They have coarse, blunt teeth and are covered by fine hair.

The  corolla has 2 lips; the upper lip is hooded (the "skullcap") and the lower lip is larger and broader with a white patch near the throat.

Etymology
The genus name Scutellariais from the Latin word scutella, small dish or saucer, referring to shape of the persistent calyx after the flowers fade. Incana is Latin for hoary or very grey.

Distribution and habitat
The plant is native in the United States from Texas to the west, Florida to the south, Wisconsin to the north, and New York to the east. It can be found in mesic to mesic-dry, partially shady habitats, including upland forests, rocky woodland slopes, thinly wooded bluffs, rocky slopes along rivers, upland meadows in wooded areas, thickets, and along roadsides in woodlands.

Ecology
The flowers bloom in late summer and are pollinated primarily by bumblebees. Other insects visit the plant to drink the nectar.

References

incana
Endemic flora of the United States
Flora of the Eastern United States
Flora of the United States
Flora of the Southeastern United States
Plants described in 1807